Chirades (locally known as Kyrades) is a mountain village in southwestern Arcadia, Greece. It is located in the mountains on the border with Messenia, at about 800 m elevation. It is 2 km east of Souli, 4 km south of Paradeisia, 6 km northwest of Tourkolekas and 14 km southwest of Megalopoli. In 2011 Chirades had a population of 80. Chirades suffered damage from the 2007 Greek forest fires.

Population

See also
List of settlements in Arcadia

References 

Megalopolis, Greece
Populated places in Arcadia, Peloponnese